Cleon (died 422 BC) was an Athenian general during the Peloponnesian War. He was the first prominent representative of the commercial class in Athenian politics, although he was an aristocrat himself. He strongly advocated for an offensive war strategy and is remembered for being ruthless in carrying out his policies. He was often depicted in a negative way, predominantly by Thucydides and the comedic playwright Aristophanes, who both represent him as an unscrupulous, warmongering demagogue.

Cleon was the son of Cleaenetus.

Public service

Opposition to Pericles
Cleon came to notice as an opponent of Pericles in the late 430s BC through his opposition to Pericles' strategy of refusing battle against the Peloponnesian League invaders in 431 BC.  As a result, he found himself acting in concert with the Athenian aristocratic parties, who stood against the "leaders of the demos", which included Isagoras, Miltiades, Thucydides, Nicias, Theramenes, and Pericles. During 430 BC, after the unsuccessful expedition by Pericles to the Peloponnesus, and when the city was devastated by the plague, Cleon headed the opposition to Pericles' rule. At this time, Pericles was accused by Cleon of maladministration of public money, with the result of Pericles being found guilty and removed from office. However, Pericles' setback was temporary and he was soon reinstated.

Rise in popularity
The death of Pericles from the plague in 429 BC left the field clear for new leadership in Athens. Hitherto Cleon had only been a vigorous opposition speaker, a trenchant critic and accuser of state officials, but he  came forward as the professed champion and leader of the democracy and rapidly came to dominate Athenian politics.  Although rough and unpolished, he was charismatic, with natural eloquence and a powerful voice, and he knew how to work upon the emotions of the Athenian populace. He strengthened his support amongst the poorer citizens by increasing the pay for jury work, which provided a livelihood for many of the poorer Athenians.

The fondness of the Athenians for litigation increased his power; and the practice of "sycophancy" (raking up material for false charges) enabled him to remove those who were likely to endanger his ascendancy. In 426 BC, Cleon brought an unsuccessful prosecution against Laches based on his generalship in the unsuccessful first Sicilian expedition.  This is one of the very few times that an Athenian general escaped civil punishment for a defeat. Having no further use for his former aristocratic associates, he broke off all connection with them, and thus felt at liberty to attack the secret combinations for political purposes, the oligarchical clubs to which they mostly belonged. He was elected one of the ten strategos for 424–423 BC. Whether he also introduced a property-tax for military purposes, and even held a high position connected with the treasury, is uncertain.

War against Sparta, subsequent death
Cleon's ruling principles were an inveterate hatred of the nobility, and an equal hatred of Sparta. It was mainly through him that the opportunity of concluding an honourable peace (in 425 BC) was lost, and in his determination to see Sparta defeated, often spoke of dazzling future benefits. He insisted upon Athenian security via strategic possession of territories rather than by Spartan goodwill.

In 427 BC, Cleon urged his Athenian countrymen to put to death the whole adult male population of Mytilene, which had put itself at the head of a revolt. His proposal, though at first accepted, was soon rescinded due to a protracted rebuttal by Diodotus. Nonetheless approximately one thousand chief leaders and prominent men of Mytilene were executed. In 425 BC, Cleon reached the summit of his fame by capturing and transporting to Athens the Spartans who had been blockaded at the Battle of Sphacteria. Much of the credit was probably due to the military skill of his colleague Demosthenes (not the orator); but it was due to Cleon's determination that the Ecclesia sent out the additional force that was needed.

It was almost certainly due to Cleon that the tribute of the "allies" was doubled in 425 BC. He was not reelected as strategos for 423–22 BC after his strategy suffered a setback when Sparta invaded Amphipolis. In 422 BC he was sent to recapture Amphipolis. This development came with the resurgence of Athenian aggressive policy toward Sparta after the revolt of Scione, an Athenian allied city. During his campaign, however, Cleon was outmaneuvered by the Spartan general Brasidas. He was killed by a peltast when his army was routed at the Battle of Amphipolis. Brasidas also died at Amphipolis and their deaths removed the chief obstacle to peace. Thus, in 421 BC the peace of Nicias was signed.

Aristophanes and Thucydides on Cleon
The character of Cleon is represented by Aristophanes and Thucydides in a very unfavourable light. Their portrayals may be justified considering he instilled a feeling of mistrust within Athens through a kind of Athenian "McCarthyism", caused by the excessive number of informants he employed to keep watch on the city. Yet, both have been suspected of being prejudiced witnesses: The playwright Aristophanes had a grudge against Cleon, who may have accused him before the Council of having ridiculed (in his lost play Babylonians) the policy and institutions of his city in the presence of foreigners and at the time of a great national danger. Thucydides, believing in the shortcomings of democratic government, had also been prosecuted (unjustly, his ships arriving two days after a town was occupied by Spartan forces) for military incapacity and exiled by a decree proposed by Cleon. Indeed, of all the persons who appear in Thucydides' History, Cleon is treated with the least impartiality. It is therefore possible that Cleon has had injustice done to him in the portraits handed down by these two writers.

His influence lay in his forceful and bullying style of oratory, anti-intellectual and anti-aristocratic in tone, and his populism. This might have brought him many enemies. He seems to have aimed at short-term goals, but Athens' poor stood to benefit by his policies, at the expense of heavy taxes levied onto her allies.

Authorities
For the literature on Cleon see Karl Friedrich Hermann, Lehrbuch der griechischen Antiquitäten, i. pt. 2 (6th ed. by V. Thumser, 1892), p. 709, and Georg Busolt, Griechische Geschichte, iii. pt. 2 (1904), p. 988, note 3.

The following are the chief authorities:
Favorable to Cleon
C. F. Ranke, De Aristophanis Vita Commentatio (Leipzig, 1845)
J. G. Droysen, Aristophanes, ii., Introd. to the Knights (Berlin, 1837)
G. Grote, History of Greece. chs. 50, 54
W. Oncken, Athen und Hellas, ii. p. 204 (Leipzig, 1866)
H. Müller-Strübing, Aristophanes und die historische Kritik (Leipzig, 1873)
J. B. Bury, Hist, of Greece, i. (1902)
Unfavorable
J. F. Kortüm, Geschichtliche Forschungen (Leipzig, 1863), and Zur Geschichte hellenichen Statsverfassungen (Heidelberg, 1821)
F. Passow, Vermischte Schriften (Leipzig, 1843)
C Thirlwall, History of Greece, ch. 21
E. Curtius, History of Greece (Eng. tr. iii. p. 112)
J. Schvarcz, Die Demokratie (Leipzig, 1882)
H. Delbrück, Die Strategie des Perikles (Berlin, 1890)
E. Meyer, Forschungen zur alten Geschichte, ii. p. 333 (Halle, 1899)
Balance between the two extreme views:
K. J. Beloch, Die attische Politik seit Perikles (Leipzig, 1884), and Griechische Geschichte, i. p. 537
A. Holm, History of Greece, ii. (Eng. tr.), ch. 23, with the notes.
H. Bengtson, History of Greece: From the Beginnings to the Byzantine Era, Cleon p. 140

In popular culture

Cleon is featured as a major antagonist in the video game Assassin's Creed Odyssey. He appears as a political adversary to Pericles, and later becomes the ruler of Athens after Pericles' death, using his new position to prolong the Peloponnesian War against Sparta. It is later revealed that this is in service to the goals of the Cult of Kosmos, a secret society of which Cleon is a member that seeks to control all of Greece. The player character, together with an inner circle of allies, including Aristophanes and Thucydides, works to discredit Cleon, prompting him to personally lead the Athenian forces during the Battle of Amphipolis in order to restore his reputation, only to be killed by the protagonist in the effort.

Notes

References

External links
 Livius.org: Cleon

422 BC deaths
5th-century BC Athenians
Sicilian Greeks
Athenians of the Peloponnesian War
Ancient Greeks killed in battle
Ancient Greek merchants
Year of birth unknown